Royal Air Force Winkleigh or more simply RAF Winkleigh is a former Royal Air Force satellite station located near to Winkleigh, Devon and south of Barnstaple, Devon, England.

The following units were here at some point:
 A detachment No. 161 Squadron RAF (1943-44)
 A detachment of No. 286 Squadron RAF (1942-)
 No. 406 Squadron RCAF (1944)
 No. 415 Squadron RCAF (1943-44)
 Norwegian Training Base

References

Citations

Bibliography

Royal Air Force stations in Devon